YBN (short for Young Boss Niggas), was an American hip-hop collective formed by Nick Simmons, who goes by the stage name YBN Nahmir. YBN was a collective of rappers, record producers, social media personalities and promoters. The collective included members from Alabama, Texas, California, Maryland, Connecticut, and Narberth, Pennsylvania.

On September 7, 2018, YBN released their only project together, YBN: The Mixtape, which featured collaborations with Gucci Mane, Wiz Khalifa, Lil Skies, Machine Gun Kelly and Chris Brown.

History 
In 2014, Nick Simmons, better known as YBN Nahmir, met YBN Almighty Jay on the video game Grand Theft Auto V. Nahmir later introduced Almighty Jay to his close friend YBN Glizzy, who he met on a San Andreas roleplay for Grand Theft Auto Online through an Xbox Looking for Group post.

YBN was originally a gaming collective where Nahmir and his friends played video games, recorded videos and uploaded their videos to YouTube and streamed on Twitch. In 2015, Nahmir and Almighty Jay eventually decided to record a song after freestyling in Xbox Live group chats. The song, titled "Hood Mentality", was both of the artists' first song, and the start of the collective's move away from video games and towards music. In 2015, crew member YBN Valley died due to a heart attack.

On September 18, 2017, Nahmir's debut single, "Rubbin Off the Paint", was released, and the music video premiered on WorldStarHipHop. The single featured production by Izak and went viral, peaking at number 46 on the Billboard Hot 100 chart. Nahmir used the financial success of the song to move himself to Los Angeles, California and help fellow friends in the collective also move to Los Angeles, marking the first time they had met in person.

Fellow members of the collective soon started to have viral songs too, though none charted. YBN Almighty Jay's "Chopsticks" in November 2017, YBN Walker's "Gutta" in February 2018, and YBN NickyBaandz "Been Trippin" in April 2018.

YBN Nahmir and YBN Glizzy met Cordae Amari Dunston, better known as YBN Cordae, online in 2017. Though Cordae didn't play video games, he had been rapping longer than any other member of YBN and was older than the rest of the collective. He decided to formally join the collective in 2018 and, in May 2018, released a remix of Eminem's "My Name Is" which quickly went viral. He followed up with his breakout single, "Old Niggas", a remix and direct response to the song "1985 - (Intro to "The Fall Off)" by J. Cole. The song was mentioned on multiple publications such as XXL, Complex and HipHopDX.
The music videos for both songs premiered on Worldstarhiphop's YouTube channel.

The group announced their first world tour in July 2018, scheduled for Fall 2018. The group's first full-length project, titled YBN: The Mixtape, which starred Nahmir, Almighty Jay and Cordae, was announced in August 2018 and was released on September 7, 2018. It included the singles "Rubbin Off The Paint" (Nahmir), "Bounce Out With That" (Nahmir), "Chopsticks" (Almighty Jay), "Bread Winners" (Nahmir and Almighty Jay), and "Kung Fu" (Cordae).

On August 6, 2020, Nahmir took to Twitter to announce that the collective had officially disbanded. Cordae implied that the collective disbanded as well as he changed his stage name from YBN Cordae to just Cordae. He also did this on all of his social media pages and streaming services.

Past members 
YBN consisted of three core members:
 YBN Nahmir
 YBN Cordae
 YBN Almighty Jay

Discography

Mixtapes

Singles

References 

Hip hop collectives
Musical groups established in 2014
Musical groups disestablished in 2020
2014 establishments in Alabama
Trap musicians
Atlantic Records artists